Johnny is a 2018 Indian Tamil-language action thriller film directed by Vetriselvan and produced by Thiagarajan. The film stars Prashanth and Sanchita Shetty, with Prabhu, Anandaraj, Ashutosh Rana, Aathma Patrick, and Sayaji Shinde amongst others in supporting roles. Johnny got mixed reviews by film critics and audience. The film is a remake of 2007 Hindi film Johnny Gaddaar which itself was an uncredited adaptation of the 1963 French film Symphonie Pour Un Massacre (The Corrupt) by Jacques Deray which in turn was based on the 1962 French crime novel Les Mystifies by Alain Reynaud Fourton.

Plot
Shakthi (Prashanth), Jaishankar (Prabhu), Prakash (Anandaraj), Ram (Ashutosh Rana), and Shiva (Aathma Patrick) are partners in a happening club in town. One day, Shiva goes to Kochi to strike a financial deal with Kalyan (Sayaji Shinde), an intelligent cop. Meanwhile, Shakthi and Ramya (Sanchita Shetty), who are in love with each other, hatch a plan to leave the country without informing anyone. Later, the partners get the shock of their life when they learn about Shiva's demise, followed by a few more assassinations. Finally, Shakthi settles scores with all his partners and pursues his dream of settling down in Canada with Ramya.

Cast

Prashanth as Johnny/Shakthi
Sanchita Shetty as Ramya
Prabhu as Jaishankar   
Anandaraj as Prakash
Ashutosh Rana as Ram
Aathma Patrick as Shiva
Sayaji Shinde as Kalyan
Aroul D. Shankar as Arul
Shankar Krishnamurthy as Advocate Jagan
Jayakumar as Naidu
Devadarshini as Prema (Prakash's wife)
Sona Heiden as Ram's wife
Kalairani as Shiva's mother
Sandhya as Indhu
Sugunthan as Security
Krishnamohan

Production
In February 2017, Thiagarajan announced that he would produce a film starring Prashanth, which would be directed by debutant Vetriselvan, an erstwhile assistant to the director Jeeva Shankar. The film was revealed to be titled Johnny during June 2017, with the makers successfully requesting the makers of the 1980 Tamil film of the same name for permission to reuse the title. Telugu actress Ananya Soni was initially revealed to be cast in the lead female role, but was later dropped. The film began shoot quietly during the same month, with the new lead actress, Sanchita Shetty revealing that the production was "60% complete" by late July 2017 after a schedule in Chennai. She also stated that the film was a remake of the successful Hindi film Johnny Gaddaar (2007) by Sriram Raghavan, and the other actors including Prabhu, Ashutosh Rana, and Sayaji Shinde would feature in key roles.

Reception 
Times of India wrote "The plot had enough substance for an edge-of-the-seat thriller and the actors were all apt in their roles. But the shoddy screenplay, logical loopholes and unimpressive making played spoilsport." The Indian Express wrote "An almost decent neo-noir thriller that falls short in its execution".

References

External links 
 

2010s heist films
2010s Tamil-language films
2018 action thriller films
2018 crime action films
2018 crime thriller films
2018 films
Indian action thriller films
Indian crime action films
Indian crime thriller films
Indian heist films
Tamil remakes of Hindi films